Ancylini is a tribe of small, freshwater, air-breathing limpets, aquatic pulmonate gastropod mollusks in the family Planorbidae, the ram's horn snails and their allies. This tribe used to be treated as a family; the current taxonomic placement within Planorbidae is according to the taxonomy of the Gastropoda (Bouchet & Rocroi, 2005).

Anatomy 
These animals have a pallial lung, as do all pulmonate snails, but they also have a false gill or "pseudobranch" which can serve perfectly well as a gill in situations where the limpet is unable to reach the surface for air, as is often the case.

Genera
Genera in the tribe Ancylini include:

 Ancylus Müller, 1773 - type genus
 Pseudancylus
 Rhodocephala

 Ferrissia Walker, 1903

 Rhodacmea Walker, 1917

 Sineancylus Gutiérrez Gregoric, 2014
 Anisancylus Pilsbry & Vanatta, 1924
 Burnupia Walker, 1912
 Gundlachia Pfeiffer, 1849
 Hebetancylus Pilsbry, 1914
 Laevapex Walker, 1903
 Stimulator
 Uncancylus Pilsbry, 1913

References

External links
 Three individuals of Laevapex fuscus hitchhiking on a water bug, which can fly between ponds

Planorbidae
Taxa named by Constantine Samuel Rafinesque